The 2004–05 season was the 99th season in the existence of RC Lens and the club's 14th consecutive season in the top flight of French football. In addition to the domestic league, Lens participated in this season's edition of the Coupe de France and the Coupe de la Ligue. The season covered the period from 1 July 2004 to 30 June 2005.

Transfers

In

Out

Competitions

Overall record

Ligue 1

League table

Results summary

Results by round

Matches

Coupe de France

Coupe de la Ligue

Statistics

Goalscorers

References

RC Lens seasons
Lens